Burden of Truth is a 2006 release by Circle II Circle. It was the band's third full-length studio release so far, and is a concept album, with the songs telling a story based on The Da Vinci Code. Unlike the band's first two albums, this album does not feature a guest appearance from lead vocalist Zak Stevens's former Savatage bandmates, Chris Caffery and Jon Oliva.

Track listing 
 "Who Am I to Be?" (Stevens, Stewart, Lee) - 5:03
 "A Matter of Time" (Stevens, Stewart) - 4:08
 "Heal You" (Stevens, Stewart, Lee) - 4:16
 "Revelations" (Stevens, Stewart) - 3:41
 "Your Reality" (Stevens, Stewart) - 4:29
 "Evermore" (Stevens, Stewart) - 2:53
 "The Black" (Stevens, Stewart, Lee) - 4:55
 "Messiah" (Stevens, Stewart) - 3:31
 "Sentenced" (Stevens, Stewart, Lee) - 4:58
 "Burden of Truth" (Stevens, Stewart) - 6:44
 "Live as One" (Stevens, Stewart) - 5:05

Personnel 
 Zak Stevens – lead vocals
 Paul Michael "Mitch" Stewart – bass guitar, keyboards, guitars, backing vocals
 Andrew Lee - guitars, backing vocals
 Tom Drennan – drums, backing vocals
 Evan Christopher – guitars, backing vocals

Further Credits 
 Recorded @ Morrisound Studios in Tampa, FL, 2005 - 2006
 Executive Producer: Dan Campbell
 Producer: Zak Stevens
 Co-produced and engineered by Jim Morris
 Mixed and Mastered: Morris / Stevens / Campbell
 Story Concept: Campbell / Stevens 
 Cover Concept: Campbell / Stevens 
 Design and Artwork : Dan Campbell / Thomas Ewerhard
 Management : Dan Campbell / Global Artists Inc.

References

External links 
 Official Circle II Circle website
 Circle II Circle on MySpace

2006 albums
Circle II Circle albums
Concept albums
AFM Records albums